The National Capital Region (NCR) is a planning region centred upon the National Capital Territory (NCT) of Delhi in India. It encompasses Delhi and several districts surrounding it from the states of Haryana, Uttar Pradesh and Rajasthan. The NCR and the associated National Capital Region Planning Board (NCRPB) were created in 1985 to plan the development of the region and to evolve harmonized policies for the control of land-uses and development of infrastructure in the region. Prominent cities of NCR include Delhi, Faridabad, Ghaziabad, Gurugram, and Noida.

The NCR is a rural-urban region, with a population of over 46,069,000 and an urbanisation level of 62.6%. As well as the cities and towns, the NCR contains ecologically sensitive areas like the Aravalli ridge, forests, wildlife and bird sanctuaries. The Delhi Extended Urban Agglomeration, a part of the NCR, had an estimated GDP of $370 billion (measured in terms of GDP PPP) in 2015–16.

History 
The National Capital Region (NCR) and its planning board were created under the National Capital Region Planning Board Act of 1985. That 1985 Act defined the NCR as being the whole of Delhi; the Haryana districts of Gurgaon, Faridabad and Sonipat, Rohtak (then including Jhajjar tehsil) and the Rewari tehsil then in Mahendragarh district; and the Uttar Pradesh districts of Bulandshahr, Muzaffarnagar, Meerut (then including Baghpat tehsil), and Ghaziabad (then including Hapur tehsil), and some part of the Rajasthan district of Alwar.

Prior to the creation of the NCR, an area described as the Delhi Metropolitan Area (DMA) was described in the 1962 Master Plan for Delhi. That plan defined the DMA as comprising the National Capital Territory and the ring towns of Ghaziabad, Faridabad, Ballabhgarh, Gurgaon, Bahadurgarh and Loni, also certain rural areas, which had a population of the somewhat less than 2.1 million in 1951. The following "Master Plan for Delhi", approved in August 1990, added Noida, Bahadurgarh and the then-proposed township of Kundli to the DMA, which consequently covered an area of 3,182 km2.

Gautam Budh Nagar district was created in 1997 out of the existing NCR districts of Ghaziabad and Bulandshahr. The city of Noida was the location of the new district's headquarters. Also in 1997 Baghpat district was created from Baghpat tehsil of Meerut district.

In July 2013, the NCR was expanded to include three more districts, Bhiwani, and Mahendragarh in the state of Haryana, as well as Bharatpur in the state of Rajasthan. This brought the number of districts in the NCR to 19 (outside Delhi NCT), with the total NCR area increasing 34% to 45,887 km2. Subsequently, Charkhi Dadri district was separated from Bhiwani district in 2016.

On 9 June 2015, the Government of India approved the inclusion of three more districts in NCR – Jind, Panipat, Karnal in the state of Haryana and Muzaffarnagar in Uttar Pradesh. covering a total area of 50,566 km2. Shamli district of U.P. was added to the NCR in December 2017. As of 2021, there are a total of 24 districts in the NCR, excluding the 11 districts of Delhi.

Proposed extensions 
On 9 January 2018, the government of Uttar Pradesh formally proposed the extension of the NCR to cover the districts Aligarh, Bijnor, Hathras and Mathura.

Proposed reductions 
Under the "Draft Regional Plan 2041", it has been proposed to limit the NCR region to 100-km radius from Rajghat in Delhi for more focused and sustainable development of the region. Government of Haryana has requested NCRPB for at least one-third reduction of its share in the NCR region.

Component districts 
A total of 24 districts in three neighbouring states of Haryana, Uttar Pradesh and Rajasthan along with whole of the National Capital Territory of Delhi constitute the National Capital Region (NCR) of India.

The areas and populations (per 2011 census, prior to the addition of Muzaffarnagar, Jind, Karnal and Shamli) of these component districts are set out below:

Regional planning

The planning body for the region is the National Capital Region Planning Board (NCRPB). It has issued two regional plans, the "Regional Plan 2001, National Capital Region" approved in 1988, and the "Regional Plan 2021, National Capital Region" approved in 2005. Topics covered by the 2001 plan included transport, telecommunications, power and water supply, waste and sewerage, education, health, the environment, housing and the "counter magnet" areas. The 2021 plan extended these with the additional topics of social infrastructure, heritage, tourism, rural development, and disaster management.

The 51% of pollution in NCR is caused by the industrial pollution, 27% by vehicles and 8% by crop burning, consequently there are plans to create a 1,600 km long and 5 km wide The Great Green Wall of Aravalli green ecological corridor along Aravalli range from Gujarat to Delhi to be connected to Sivalik hill range with the planting of 1.35 billion (135 crore) new native trees over 10 years. About 46% of the National Capital Region, home to 40 to 50 million people, is not connected to sewage networks. Sewage from these areas flows into stormwater drains that empty directly into the Yamuna.

Transport

Central National Capital Region
The 2001 Regional Plan defined the "Delhi Metropolitan Area" (DMA) as comprising the controlled areas of contiguous towns of Ghaziabad–Loni and Noida in Uttar Pradesh; Faridabad–Ballabharh, Gurgaon, Bahadurgarh, Kundli and extension of Delhi Ridge in Haryana.

Under the 2021 Regional plan, the Delhi Metropolitan Area was redesignated as "Central National Capital Region" (CNCR) wherein new areas were added. The CNCR comprises controlled areas of contiguous towns of Ghaziabad–Loni and Noida in Uttar Pradesh; Gurgaon–Manesar, Faridabad–Ballabgarh, Bahadurgarh, and Sonipat–Kundli in Haryana.

The 2021 plan estimated the 2001 population of the CNCR outside of Delhi to be over 2.8 million, while Delhi's population was 13.8 million, yielding a total CNCR population of 16.6 million.  the most recent population estimates have spanned 25.7 to 26.5 million people.

Counter magnets
The 1985 Act (§2.c and §8.f) gives the NCRCB the ability to select districts outside of the NCR to act as counter magnets, with a view to developing them further.
Counter-magnet cities are identified as those that can be developed as alternative centres of growth and attract migrants to them rather than Delhi. The criteria for selecting counter magnet towns are: that they should have their own established roots and potential of growth, and should not be centres of either religious, strategic or environmental importance. The counter magnet cities should be given priority when allocating funding for development of land, housing and infrastructure.

Following are the nine Counter-Magnet Areas to NCR spread across six states:

Hisar and Ambala in Haryana
Bareilly and Kanpur in Uttar Pradesh
Kota and Jaipur in Rajasthan
Patiala in Punjab
Gwalior in Madhya Pradesh
Dehradun in Uttarakhand

See also

 Chennai metropolitan area
 Kolkata metropolitan area
 Mumbai Metropolitan Region

References

External links 
 National Capital Region Planning Board 
 Famous Temples in Delhi NCR
 NCR map
 Official area information of districts of India
 Bulandshahr Official Website
 Bhiwani Official Site
 Mahendragarh Official Site
 National Capital Region (India): Counter-Magnet Areas on Indpaedia
 National Capital Region Urban Infrastructure Financing Facility on Asian Development Bank

Geography of Delhi
National Capital Region (India)